Hannah Elizabeth Waterman (born 22 July 1975) is an English actress. She is best known for her portrayal of Laura Beale in the BBC soap opera EastEnders (2000–2004).

Early life 
Waterman was born on 22 July 1975 in London to actor Dennis Waterman and actress Patricia Maynard. She attended Norwich High School for Girls and Saint Felix School, Southwold and Putney High School. She is also a graduate of the University of Warwick.

Career

EastEnders 
Waterman joined the cast of BBC soap opera EastEnders as Laura Dunn in February 2000. Waterman previously appeared in the soap as an HIV patient in 1997. The character of Laura became the third wife of Ian Beale (Adam Woodyatt), but the marriage was not a happy one as the paternity of Laura's son Bobby was disputed. The character was killed off on 30 April 2004, after falling down the stairs in her flat after tripping over a toy when going to answer the door. Janine Evans (Charlie Brooks) was wrongly accused of murdering her after a receipt was found in Laura's flat following a bust-up. Waterman's mother Patricia Maynard played Laura's mother in EastEnders for a couple of episodes in 2001, and her one-time step mother Rula Lenska had also made a guest appearance in the series during Laura's run playing Frank Butcher's girlfriend in the Spain episodes in 2002.

Other work 
Since her departure from EastEnders, Waterman has appeared in episodes of the BBC medical dramas Doctors and Holby City, The Bill and a recurring role in New Tricks, which also starred her father.

On stage she has appeared in The Vagina Monologues, Soap at The Stephen Joseph theatre and Tom, Dick and Harry and Calendar Girls in the West End.

On 7 January 2007, she won the second series of the BBC's Just the Two of Us game show singing with Marti Pellow.

She has been seen in an episode of the Afternoon Play series on BBC1, in an acclaimed run of Alan Ayckbourn's Round and Round the Garden at the Theatre Royal, Windsor and as a contestant on Sky One's Cirque de Celebrité.

In 2009, she released an exercise DVD called Hannah Waterman's Body Blitz.

On 22 December 2009, she appeared on Channel 4 in a Christmas special edition of Come Dine with Me alongside David Gest, Diarmuid Gavin and Sherrie Hewson.

In 2010, she toured alongside Brigit Forsyth in a production of Carrie's War playing the part of Auntie Lou.

In 2013, she toured in Lindsay Posner's production of Abigail's Party playing the lead role of Beverly Moss.

Personal life 
Waterman married fellow EastEnders actor Ricky Groves in 2006. They separated in 2010 and divorced in 2014. Waterman has been in a relationship with Huw Higginson since 2010. They have a son, born 2011. They relocated to Australia in 2014 and married on 11 October 2022.

Filmography 
 Television

 Film

 Theatre

References

Further reading 
 "Actress too good for soap says dad Dennis." United Kingdom: Coventry Evening Telegraph 2 Sep. 2003. TheFreeLibrary.com. Web. 13 Jan. 2012. <Actress too good for soap says dad Dennis. - Free Online Library>.

External links 
 

1975 births
Living people
20th-century English actresses
21st-century English actresses
Actresses from London
Alumni of the University of Warwick
English soap opera actresses
English television actresses
People educated at Norwich High School for Girls
People educated at Putney High School
People educated at Saint Felix School
Reality show winners